Levopimaradiene synthase (EC 4.2.3.32, PtTPS-LAS, LPS, copalyl-diphosphate diphosphate-lyase [abieta-8(14),12-diene-forming]) is an enzyme with systematic name (+)-copalyl-diphosphate diphosphate-lyase (abieta-8(14),12-diene-forming). This enzyme catalyses the following chemical reaction

 (+)-copalyl diphosphate  abieta-8(14),12-diene + diphosphate

In Ginkgo, the enzyme catalyses the initial cyclization step in the biosynthesis of ginkgolides.

References

External links 
 

EC 4.2.3